Savage Empire is a novel by Jean Lorrah published in 1981.

Plot summary
Savage Empire is a novel in which two societies have been warring for many years: the psionic Aventine Empire and the barbarians who practice magic.

Reception
Greg Costikyan reviewed Savage Empire in Ares Magazine #9 and commented that "On the whole, Savage Empire is an entertaining though flawed first effort, good enough to justify looking for Lorrah's next novel."

Reviews
Review by Tom Staicar (1981) in Amazing Stories, September 1981

References

1981 novels